The effects of Hurricane Jeanne in Puerto Rico included the most damage from a tropical cyclone since Hurricane Georges in 1998. Jeanne, the tenth tropical storm of the 2004 Atlantic hurricane season, struck the United States territory of Puerto Rico on September 15 with  winds. The rainfall caused widespread flooding, resulting in landslides and heavy crop damage. Winds reached  at Cayey, and its combination with the rainfall left most of the island without power or water.

Before Jeanne struck, the Puerto Rican governor ordered shutting down the island's entire power supply to prevent electrocution deaths. In the days after the storm, the power and water were restored. With damage totaling $169.5 million (2004 USD), President George W. Bush declared Puerto Rico as a disaster area, which allocated federal funds for assistance. Ultimately, more than 155,933 people received $401.1 million in aid. Overall, Jeanne caused eight deaths on the island, four of which directly, and the name was eventually retired from the naming list.

Preparations
Hurricane Jeanne originated as a tropical depression on September 13 from a tropical wave, just east of the Lesser Antilles. At that time, the United States government issued a tropical storm warning for the entirety of Puerto Rico, about 43 hours prior to Jeanne making landfall on the island. As it moved through the northeastern Caribbean Sea the storm steadily intensified, and by late on September 14 Jeanne was forecast to move across the island as a minimal hurricane. As a result, the tropical storm warning was upgraded to a hurricane warning.

Prior to hitting, 3,629 people evacuated to 159 schools converted into emergency shelters. Governor Sila María Calderón forbade the sale of alcohol during the storm. All ports around the island were closed, and most flights were canceled. Due to the threat for downed wires, the governor ordered for the entire island's power grid to be turned off during the storm. During Hurricane Hugo in 1989, six people were electrocuted to death, which influenced the decision. In addition, ferry trips from the main island to Vieques and Culebra stopped during the storm.

In Vega Baja, an elderly man fell from a roof to his death while installing storm shutters. As Jeanne moved ashore, an eye was in the process of developing, indicating winds near hurricane status, although hurricane-force winds still affected higher elevations. Jeanne quickly crossed Puerto Rico and eventually attained hurricane status in the Mona Passage between the island and Dominican Republic.

Impact

Upon striking Puerto Rico, Jeanne produced tropical storm force winds in portions of the island. In Cayey, located in the center of the island, a  gust was reported, just shy of hurricane force. In Yabucoa, the winds killed one woman after she was flung into a wall.

Most of Jeanne's impact came from its rainfall. At that station, the rainfall reached  in a 24‑hour period, surpassing a 1 in 100 year event. Heavy rainfall also fell on the offshore island of Culebra. The heavy rainfall caused severe flooding along many rivers of Puerto Rico, forcing 3,629 people to evacuate their houses in flood zones. The one and only flood-related death occurred when a person drowned in the Culebrinas River in Moca. Across the island, Jeanne produced mudslides and landslides and left $8 million in damage (2004 USD) to the water system; about 600,000 people were left without running water.

Throughout Puerto Rico, Jeanne heavily damaged schools, houses, businesses. Strong wind gusts left 70% of the island without power, and damage to the electrical grid totaled $60 million (2004 USD). The combination of fallen trees, landslides, and debris closed 302 roads and left many bridges damaged. The storm left heavy crop damage in the southern and eastern portion of the island, particularly to coffee, plantain, banana, and wheat crops. In Jayuya, the storm destroyed 30% of the coffee crop. Of the $101.5 million crop damage total, more than half was from the banana crop.

Overall, Jeanne killed four people directly and another four indirectly in Puerto Rico; damage totaled $169.5 million (2004 USD), making it the most damaging tropical cyclone since Hurricane Georges in 1998.

Aftermath
Following the passage of the storm, two people died due to carbon monoxide poisoning after running a generator in closed space without proper ventilation. Two others died and another was injured when a tree damaged by winds fell onto their car near Yauco. Due to contaminated water supplies, authorities advised people to boil water before consumption. In the day after the storm's passage, electric companies restored power to all but 870,000 people. Most of the western portion of the island was repaired first, as were hospitals and the Luis Muñoz Marín International Airport.

On September 17, two days after Jeanne struck, United States President George W. Bush declared Puerto Rico a disaster area, which provided for the cost of debris removal and emergency services. In the immediate aftermath, the Federal Emergency Management Agency (FEMA) funded crisis counseling services for storm victims, set up by the Puerto Rico Department of Health/ Mental Health and Anti-Addiction Services Administration. After the storm's passage, FEMA established six disaster recovery centers. Ultimately, more than 206,000 people applied for disaster assistance, including grants for essential repairs and temporary housing. FEMA approved the request for 155,933 people, providing $401.1 million in aid. In March 2005, the US Government provided $14.6 million in aid for reconstruction projects, including repairs to the power grid, as well as general road and bridge restoration.

Due to its damage along its path, Hurricane Jeanne was retired by the World Meteorological Organization in Spring 2005, meaning the name will never be used again for an Atlantic hurricane. The name was replaced by Julia which was used during the 2010 season.

See also

2004 Atlantic hurricane season

References

Puerto Rico
Jeanne (2004)
2004 in Puerto Rico
Jeanne
Jeanne PR